Michael Günther (born 27 April 1950) is a German former swimmer. He competed at the 1968 Summer Olympics and the 1972 Summer Olympics.

References

1950 births
Living people
German male swimmers
Olympic swimmers of West Germany
Swimmers at the 1968 Summer Olympics
Swimmers at the 1972 Summer Olympics
Sportspeople from Brandenburg